Bloomington–Normal, officially known as the Bloomington, Illinois Metropolitan Statistical Area, is a metropolitan area in Central Illinois anchored by the twin municipalities of Bloomington and Normal. At the 2010 census, the municipalities had a combined urban population of 132,600, while the metropolitan area had a population of 169,572.

Prior to 2013, the metropolitan area consisted of only McLean County. In 2013, the Office of Management and Budget revised the delineations of the metropolitan area to include all of DeWitt and McLean counties. Additionally, the Bloomington–Pontiac Combined Statistical Area was created to combine the Bloomington MSA with the Pontiac, Illinois micropolitan statistical area. The CSA includes all of DeWitt, McLean, and Livingston counties.

See also
 Illinois statistical areas

References

External links 
 

 
Geography of McLean County, Illinois